The Ohio Web Library is a large collection of over 280 electronic information resources, or online databases, provided by Libraries Connect Ohio (LCO), which is composed of four major Ohio library networks — OPLIN, OhioLINK, INFOhio, and the State Library of Ohio. Within these licensed databases are almost 31,000 individual electronic serial titles (i.e., publications with ISSN), and the databases are accessed through a federated search tool or meta search engine with a simple interface.

LCO can cooperatively purchase access to these statewide resources at a cost-effective rate whereas most individual libraries would not be able to afford them on their own. These subscription-based research databases are available for free to all Ohio residents regardless of their location, age, education, or economic status and include online publications and research resources, such as scholarly journals, popular magazines, trade publications, newspapers (Ohio and nationwide), encyclopedias, dictionaries, and educational/training tutorials.

Funding and Governance 
The Ohio Web Library is funded by a federal IMLS Library Services and Technology Act (LSTA) grant through the State Library of Ohio, which provides about $1.5 million per year. The three LCO library networks — OPLIN, OhioLINK, and INFOhio — provide an additional $3 million in state funds each year from their budgets. The federal LSTA grant that helps fund the Ohio Web Library is a temporary funding measure that expires every June 30. No permanent funding is in place to sustain these resources or to expand them.

The Ohio Web Library resources are purchased by Ohio libraries and library organizations for exclusive use by Ohio residents. This system uses IP address recognition to verify whether someone is located in Ohio, but these resources can also be accessed by providing an Ohio public library card number for user authentication.

Collaborative Library Organizations 
The Ohio Web Library is a collaborative effort of Ohio libraries and the following library organizations:

 INFOhio
 Ohio Library and Information Network (OhioLINK)
 Ohio Public Library Information Network (OPLIN)
 State Library of Ohio (SLO)

Ohio Public Library Information Network (OPLIN) 
The Ohio Public Library Information Network (OPLIN) provides broadband Internet connections and related information services to Ohio public libraries. Its primary mission is to ensure that all Ohio residents have free public Internet access through the 251 independent local public library systems in Ohio, as well as the use of research databases not freely available on the World Wide Web.

As a state government agency, OPLIN receives extensive fiscal support services from the State Library of Ohio and contracts with the Ohio Office of Information Technology for assistance with network management. Most of the budget is used to purchase the services provided to Ohio public libraries, primarily Internet access and information databases. Because OPLIN provides these services, public libraries do not need to pay for them from their individual budgets.

Statewide Research Databases

Genealogy 
 Explore Ohio | OPLIN
 Ohio Death Certificate Index (1913–1944)
 Sanborn Fire Insurance Maps

Magazines & Newspapers 
 All EBSCOhost Databases
 MasterFILE Premier | EBSCOhost
 NewsBank (Ohio's Newspapers)
 Newspaper Source | EBSCOhost

Reference & Research 
 Academic Search Premier
 Explore Ohio | OPLIN
 Ohio History Central || Online Encyclopedia
 Oxford Reference Online
 Student Research Center
 World Book Hispanica
 World Book Spanish
 World Book Online

Students & Homework 
 Kids Search | EBSCOhost
 Searchasaurus | EBSCOhost
 Student Research Center | EBSCOhost
 World Book Kids

Books, Arts, & Literature 
 About:Books
 American and English full text literature collections
 ART Collection
 Oxford Reference Online

Business & Government 
 Business Source Premier | EBSCOhost
 Explore Ohio | OPLIN
 Ohio.gov: Government Information & Services
 Regional Business News | EBSCOhost

History & Biography 
 Biography Reference Bank
 Explore Ohio | OPLIN
 Ohio Death Certificate Index (1913–1944)
 Ohio History Central || Online Encyclopedia
 Ohio Memory Online Scrapbook
 Sanborn Fire Insurance Maps

Science 
 Ohioline
 Science Online

Employment Resources & Practice Exams 
 LearningExpress Library
 Job & Career Accelerator

References

External links 
 Ohio Web Library
 OPLIN Databases
 ExploreOhio
 OPLIN
 INFOhio
 OhioLINK
 State Library of Ohio

Online databases
Public libraries in Ohio
Communications in Ohio
Publications of the Ohio state government
Databases in the United States